Commotria phlebicella is a species of snout moth in the genus Commotria. It was described by George Hampson in 1918, and is known from Zimbabwe and South Africa.

References

Moths described in 1918
Anerastiini